The Taylor Group is a geologic group in Arkansas. It preserves fossils dating back to the Cretaceous period.

See also

 List of fossiliferous stratigraphic units in Arkansas
 Paleontology in Arkansas

References
 

Geologic groups of Arkansas
Cretaceous System of North America